The 2012–13 Goa Professional League (also known as the Kingfisher Goa Pro League for sponsorship reasons) was the 15th season of top-tier football in the Indian state of Goa. It began on 1 September 2012. Dempo were the defending champions.

Teams

First Stage League table

Championship League

Table

Fixtures and results

Goalscorers
3 goals:
 Juanfri (Sporting Goa)

2 goals:

 Sunil Chhetri (Churchill Brothers)
 Joy Ferrao (Dempo)
 O. J. Obatola (Salgaocar)
 Yogesh Kadam (SESA)
 Charles Miranda (SESA)
 Ogba Kalu Nnanna (Sporting Goa)
 Dawson Fernandes (Sporting Goa)

1 goal:

 Richard Costa (Churchill Brothers)
 Romeo Fernandes (Dempo)
 Cliffton Gonsalves (Dempo)
 Godwin Franco (Dempo)
 Josimar da Silva Martins (Salgaocar)
 Gilbert Oliveira (Salgaocar)
 Marcus Mascarenhas (Salgaocar)
 Augustin Fernandes (Salgaocar)
 Chukwudi Chukwuma (SESA)
 Ponif Vaz (SESA)
 Freiman Peixoto (Sporting Goa)
 Pratesh Shirodkar (Sporting Goa)
 Valerio Rodrigues (Sporting Goa)
 Victorino Fernandes (Sporting Goa)
 Rowllin Borjes (Sporting Goa)

Relegation League

Table

Fixtures and Results

Goalscorers
2 goals:

 Angelo D'Souza (Cavelossim)

1 goal:

 Gammy Costa (Margao)
 Joel Camara (Margao)
 Sectorio Monteiro (Wilred Leisure)
 Aliston Fernandes (Wilred Leisure)
 Fredrick Endro (Cavelossim)
 Wilton Gomes (Cavelossim)
 Julius Akpele (Cavelossim)
 Joaquim Carvalho (Cavelossim)
 Jolex Fernandes (Cavelossim)
 Samson Fernandes (Cavelossim)
 Elvino Fernandes (Vasco)
 Chatur Naik (Goa Velha)
 Nester Dias (Goa Velha)
 Alber Gonsalves (Goa Velha)
 Saprem Diukar (Goa Velha)

See also
 Goa Professional League

References

External links
Goa Pro League page at Goa Football Association website

Goa Professional League seasons
3